Note that this list focuses on the television network(s) and announcers who have broadcast the Little League World Series' World Championship Game.

1950s

1960s

1970s

1980s

Notes
At first, only the World Championship Game was televised under the Wide World of Sports anthology umbrella on ABC. Since the late 1980s, when the tournament was reorganized, both the U.S. and international championships, the "semifinals," have been shown.
ESPN first began covering the games in 1982. With the expansion of ESPN's brand and its family of networks, the total number of games has significantly increased. In 2000, a total of 12 games were televised by ESPN. In addition, the popularity of the game increased the total number of teams from 8 to 16 and ESPN covered all eight U.S. regional championships in 2001 (something they still do today). This was as a result of a second stadium, Volunteer Stadium, which allowed games to take place simultaneously. Also that year, ABC began televising the U.S. Championship Game. That year, ESPN aired a total of 25 games. In 2003, ABC, ESPN, and ESPN2 carried a total of 35 games including regional championships. All games aired on any ESPN network are also available via Internet streaming on ESPN3.
1985 - ABC carries the Little League World Series championship game live for the first time on Wide World of Sports. For the first time in baseball history, the home plate umpire wears a miniature camera on his mask.

1990s

Notes
1994 - A three-hour rain delay forced Wide World of Sports to go off the air on many ABC affiliates before the game could be completed. The West Coast however, got to see the remainder of the game live from Williamsport, Pa.
1997 - For the first time, U.S. Regional championship games in Little League Baseball are televised nationally on ESPN2.

2000s

Notes
2002 - Both the U.S. Championship and World Championship Games were televised live during prime time for the first time (6:30 ET). The World Championship Game was aired on tape delay on the West Coast.
In 2006, 28 of the 36 games were televised on ESPN, ESPN2, and ABC.
2006 - The World Championship Game was initially supposed to air on ABC. However, a rain delay caused the game to be postponed until following day (Monday, August 28, 2006). As a result, the Championship Game instead, aired on ESPN2.
In January 2007, it was announced that ESPN, ESPN2, and ABC had extended their contract with the Little League organization through 2014.

2010s

2020s

See also
Wide World of Sports
Major League Baseball on ABC
ESPN Major League Baseball
Little League World Series#Little League World Series champions
Little League World Series#Media coverage
Little League World Series on television

References

External links
Tony Gwynn To Be In Broadcast Booth For Little League Baseball World Series
ESPN.com
Little League Chronology
NASO LockerRoom - ESPN Expands Little League World Series Coverage

Baseball announcers
Broadcasters
Baseball on television in the United States
ABC Sports
CBS Sports
ESPN announcers
ESPN2
Lists of announcers of American sports events
Wide World of Sports (American TV series)